Scaligeria may refer to:
 Scaligeria (fly), a genus of flies in the family Sarcophagidae
 Scaligeria (plant), a genus of plants in the family Apiaceae